German submarine U-1025 was a Type VIIC/41 U-boat of Nazi Germany's Kriegsmarine during World War II.

She was ordered on 13 June 1942, and was laid down on 3 June 1943, at Blohm & Voss, Hamburg, as yard number 225. She was launched on 24 May 1944, and commissioned under the command of Oberleutnant zur See Ewald Pick on 12 April 1945.

Design
German Type VIIC/41 submarines were preceded by the heavier Type VIIC submarines. U-1025 had a displacement of  when at the surface and  while submerged. She had two shafts and two  propellers.

U-1025 was fitted with five  torpedo tubes (four fitted at the bow and one at the stern), fourteen torpedoes or 26 TMA or TMB Naval mines, one  SK C/35 naval gun, (220 rounds), one  Flak M42 and two  C/30 anti-aircraft guns. The boat had a complement of between forty-four and fifty-two.

Service history
On 30 September 1944, U-1025 was transferred to Flensburger Schiffbau-Gesellschaft in Flensburg to be finished. She was commissioned on 12 April 1945, but was taken out of service only 18 days later, on 30 April, because of defective batteries. She was scuttled in Flensburg Fjord on 5 May 1945, as part of Operation Regenbogen. Her wreck was raised and broken up later.

See also
 Battle of the Atlantic

References

Bibliography

German Type VIIC/41 submarines
U-boats commissioned in 1945
World War II submarines of Germany
1944 ships
Ships built in Hamburg
Operation Regenbogen (U-boat)
Maritime incidents in May 1945
U-boats scuttled in 1945